Benjamin Willis may refer to:

Benjamin A. Willis (1840–1886), American politician
Benjamin Willis (educator) (1901–1988), American educator and school administrator

See also
Ben Willis (disambiguation)